{{DISPLAYTITLE:C24H34O5}}
The molecular formula C24H34O5 (molar mass: 402.52 g/mol) may refer to:

 Bufagin, a toxic steroid obtained from toad's milk
 Cortexolone 17α-propionate
 Dehydrocholic acid

Molecular formulas